Lake Lotta is a kidney-shaped natural freshwater lake in Orange County, Florida. Florida State Road 50 (West Colonial Drive) travels over this lake. To the east are shopping areas and to the north, south and west are residential areas. The only public access to this lake is along Vizcaya Lake Road, along part of the southeast shore of the lake. There are no swimming areas or public boat ramps on this lake. No reliable fishing information exists for Lake Lotta on online sites.

References

Lakes of Florida
Lakes of Orange County, Florida